STAT, Stat. , or stat may refer to:

 stat (system call), a Unix system call that returns file attributes of an inode
 Stat (TV series), an American sitcom that aired in 1991
 Stat (website), a health-oriented news website
 STAT protein, a signal transducer and activator protein
 Special Tertiary Admissions Test (STAT), an Australian scholastic aptitude test
 St. Albert Transit (StAT), the public transportation system in St. Albert, Alberta, Canada
 stat, an abbreviation of statim that means "immediately" in medical jargon
 Stat., abbreviation of United States Statutes at Large
 Statistic (role-playing games), a piece of data which represents a particular aspect of a fictional character

See also 
 Strat (disambiguation)